NZR G class may refer to one of two classes of locomotives formerly used on New Zealand Railways:

NZR G class (1874)
NZR G class (1928)